This is a list of lakes of Alberta, Canada.

Most of Alberta's lakes were formed during the last glaciation, about 12,000 years ago. 
There are many different types of lakes in Alberta, from glacial lakes in the Canadian Rockies to small shallow lakes in the prairies, brown water lakes in the northern boreal forest and muskeg, kettle holes and large lakes with sandy beaches and clear water in the central plains.

Distribution of the lakes throughout the province of Alberta is irregular, with many water bodies in the wet boreal plains in the north, and very few in the semi-arid Palliser's Triangle in the southeast.


River basins
Most of Alberta's waters are drained in a general north or northeastern direction, with six major rivers forming four major watersheds collecting the water and removing it from the province:
 The Peace River and Athabasca River flow north and east, meeting in the massive Peace–Athabasca Delta, eventually feeding the Mackenzie River in south-central Northwest Territories and draining into the Arctic Ocean
 The North and South Saskatchewan Rivers flow east and form the Saskatchewan River in central Saskatchewan, flowing into Lake Winnipeg, which drains into Hudson Bay on the Arctic/North Atlantic oceans
 There is an endorheic area between the North and South Saskatchewan basins, the Sounding Creek system, where most of the water drains to Manitou Lake (not to be confused with the more famous Little Manitou Lake) and evaporates.
 The smaller Beaver River in east-central Alberta flows east into the Churchill River  in north-central Saskatchewan and then drains into Hudson Bay
 The smaller Milk River in southeast Alberta flows south into the Missouri River in northeastern Montana, which joins the Mississippi River and drains into the Gulf of Mexico

As with other basins on the planet, the topographical highlights in the drainage divides between these basins can be difficult to discern. For example, there is little elevation change in the short  of land between Lac la Biche and Beaver Lake, yet the former is in a watershed that drains north into the Arctic Ocean, while the latter is in a watershed that drains east into Hudson Bay.

Largest lakes
Lake Athabasca is the largest lake in both Alberta and Saskatchewan.

Lake Claire is just west of Lake Athabasca, with both located in the remote Peace-Athabasca Delta.

List of lakes
This section provides a list of numerous lakes of Alberta, including the "large" ones shown in the previous section.

Note that the lakes are listed alphabetically by their main name, dropping any leading "lake", "lac", "lac la", "upper/lower", "north/south".  For example, Lac la Nonne (the nun lake) is entered under "N". If desired, using the table sort function will give the list sorted by the leading word.

See also

List of Alberta rivers
Geography of Alberta

References

Lakes
Alberta